Park So-young (Hangul: 박소영; born 27 May 1994) is a South Korean badminton player.

Achievements

BWF Grand Prix (1 runner-up) 
The BWF Grand Prix has two levels: Grand Prix and Grand Prix Gold. It is a series of badminton tournaments, sanctioned by Badminton World Federation (BWF) since 2007.

Women's doubles

  BWF Grand Prix Gold tournament
  BWF Grand Prix tournament

BWF International Challenge/Series (1 title)
Mixed doubles

 BWF International Challenge tournament
 BWF International Series tournament

References

External links 
 

1994 births
Living people
South Korean female badminton players